Mika Lehto (born April 12, 1979) is a Finnish former professional ice hockey goaltender. He played in the SM-liiga for Ässät, JYP and Tappara. He was drafted 224th overall by the Pittsburgh Penguins in the 1998 NHL Entry Draft.

External links

1979 births
Living people
Ässät players
Finnish ice hockey goaltenders
JYP Jyväskylä players
Pittsburgh Penguins draft picks
Tappara players